Petrini is an Italian surname. Notable people with the surname include:

 Bartolommeo Petrini (1642–1664), Italian painter of the late-Baroque period
 Carlo Petrini (born 1949), Italian activist and founder of the international Slow Food movement
 Carlo Petrini (scientist) (born 1965), Italian scientist and senior researcher at the Italian National Institute of Health
 Carlo Petrini (footballer) (1948–2012), Italian football player and coach 
 Elena Maria Petrini, Italian triathlete and 2010 aquathlon world champion
 Francesco Petrini (1744–1819), harpist and composer
 Giuseppe Petrini, Italian composer
 Giuseppe Antonio Petrini (1677– c. 1755), Swiss painter of the late-Baroque, active mainly in Lugano
 Gulli Petrini (1867–1941), Swedish Physicist, writer, suffragette, women's rights activist and politician
 Henrik Petrini (1863–1957), Swedish mathematician
 Hilda Petrini (1838–1895), Swedish clock maker of Italian descent
 Raffaella Petrini (born 1969), Italian religious sister

Italian-language surnames
Surnames from given names